An election to Slough Borough Council was held on 10 June 2004.  The whole council was up for election. This was the 120th Slough general local authority election, since Slough became a local government unit in 1863, including both whole Council elections and elections by thirds.

The Borough had been re-warded for this election. For the previous three Slough elections, which had each returned a third of the council, see 2001 Slough Council election, 2002 Slough Council election and 2003 Slough Council election.

The 2004 election was to fill forty-one seats. The leading vote winner in each of the fourteen wards was elected for the term 2004–2008. The second placed candidates were elected for 2004–2007. In all the wards, except Colnbrook with Poyle, the candidate with the third highest number of votes was elected for the term 2004–2006.

Recent political history of Slough to 2004
Slough Borough Council, between 1983 and 2004, had been controlled by the Labour Party.
  
Between 2003 and 2004, there were three groups of Councillors. In addition to the Labour Group and the Conservative Group there was the Britwellian, Independent, Liberal and Liberal Democrat Group (BILLD).

The BILLD Group was composed of all the Councillors, who were not Labour or Conservative. It was a coalition of a number of parties and independents. These included a Councillor or Councillors elected in particular wards; Liberal Democrat (Foxborough ward), Liberal (Haymill ward), Independent Britwellian Residents (Britwell ward) and Independent (Wexham Lea ward).

The existing members of the Group had an electoral pact for the 2004 election, which also extended to the Independent Farnham Residents candidates in Farnham ward and the Independent Langley Residents candidates in Langley St Mary's ward.

In 2003–2004, the composition of the 41 member council was:-
 Labour 26
 BILLD 9 (Independent Britwellian Residents 3, Slough Liberals 3, Independents 2 and Slough Liberal Democrat 1) 
 Conservative 6

In the 2004 election 105 candidates were nominated for the 41 seats up for election. The list is broken down by Party, with a residual category of an Independent candidate not affiliated to BILLD.

 Labour 41
 Conservative 28
 BILLD 26 (Slough Liberal Democrats 11, Independents 3, Independent Britwellian Residents 3, Independent Farnham Residents 3, Independent Langley Residents 3, Slough Liberals 3)
 Green Party of England and Wales 7
 United Kingdom Independence Party 2
 Independent 1

Council by Party before and after 2004 Elections
Before the elections held on 10 June 2004, the composition of Slough Borough Council was as follows:

 Labour overall majority (2003–2004): 11 
 No overall majority (2004–2006)

Note: The Others category in this table includes all non-Labour, Conservative and Liberal Democrat Councillors. Richard Stokes (Liberal-Haymill) is the BILLD Group Leader, which includes the Liberal Democrats and all the Others category Councillors.

Composition of expiring seats before election

 * Member of the BILLD Group

Election result (overall summary)

Note: Due to boundary changes and this being a whole Council election, non-comparable to the 2003 election of a third of the Council, no attempt is made to provide numbers to fill the gain, loss and plus/minus columns.

History of Slough boundaries and wards
The Slough local government area came into existence in 1863. It comprised a part of the parish of Upton-cum-Chalvey, roughly corresponding to the modern Central and Upton wards.

In 1894 Slough became a civil parish and then an Urban District.

The northern boundary was extended up Stoke Road, as far as the Slough branch of the Grand Union Canal. To the south and west, Chalvey and the Salt Hill area, as far as the Montem Mound, were absorbed. To the east, part of Langley joined the district. The Agar's Plough area left Slough, to become part of Eton and provide playing fields for Eton College.

Parts of the parishes of Burnham, Dorney, Farnham Royal, Horton, Langley Marish and Stoke Poges were added to Slough.

Slough was first warded in 1930. The original seven wards were Burnham, Central, Chalvey, Farnham, Langley, Stoke and Upton.

The town was re-warded in 1950, when four of the previous wards (Burnham, Central, Farnham and Stoke) were split into north and south wards, to make a total of eleven.

Britwell and Wexham Court were added to Slough in 1973 (when these two new wards and the eleven existing wards were allocated between two and nine seats, instead of the three per ward which had existed previously).

There was another re-warding in 1983, which created thirteen three-member wards with revised boundaries.

Colnbrook & Poyle was added to Slough in 1995 and became a fourteenth ward, with one member 1995-1997 and two from 1997.

For Slough Council election 2004 the Borough was re-warded. There were still fourteen wards, but only Colnbrook with Poyle (formerly Colnbrook & Poyle) and Haymill had unchanged boundaries.

Election results by wards 2004

Baylis & Stoke
Baylis & Stoke (born 2004) is a three-member ward in the north of the Borough, to the west of Central ward and to the east of Haymill. It broadly combined the former Baylis and Stoke wards. Baylis was named after Baylis House and the estate of Baylis, which from the sixteenth century was a sub-division of the old parish of Stoke Poges (the southern part of which is included in Slough). Stoke was named after the parish. 2003-2004: the six seats in the former wards were all held by Labour. 2004: The Liberal Democrats, building on the Liberal tradition of the marginal former Stoke ward and overcoming the Labour leanings of the former Baylis ward, won all three seats in 2004.

 
 
 
 
 
 
 
 
 
 

 * BILLD Group candidate

Britwell
Britwell (born 1973) is a three-member ward in the north-west of the Borough. It includes Britwell parish, although since 1983 some unparished territory was added. Before Britwell became a civil parish it was a district of the old parish of Burnham. Britwell elected some Liberal Councillors in the 1980s but was otherwise safely Labour until 2000. Since then Britwellian and Independent Britwellian Residents Councillors have become increasingly successful. In 1997 Labour won all three seats, but by 2003-2004 the Residents held the three seats. 2004: Independent Britwellian Residents retained the three seats.

 
 
 
 
 
 
 
  
 
 

 * BILLD Group candidate

Central
Central (1930-1950 and 1983-) has had different boundaries during the three of the four Slough redistributions in which it has existed (it was divided between Central North and Central South wards 1950-1983), but it has always been a three-member ward with Wexham to the north, Langley to the east, Upton to the south, Chalvey to the south-west and Baylis & Stoke to the west. It was part of the original parish of Upton-cum-Chalvey, although the hamlet of Slough (a few scattered houses and coaching inns along the Great West Road and Windsor Road) was smaller than the villages of Upton and Chalvey until the Great Western Railway arrived in the 1840s. 2003-2004: Labour held the three seats under the 1983 boundaries. 2004: Labour won one and the Conservatives two of the three seats of the revised ward.

Chalvey
Chalvey (born 1930), (in the south of the Borough) is a three-member ward. In the nineteenth century it was a village that was part of the ancient parish of Upton-cum-Chalvey. It became an original ward of Slough. The ward has existed in some form continuously since the district was first warded in 1930. Before 1970 Chalvey was Conservative but since then it has been safely Labour. 2003-2004: Three Labour seats. 2004: The Liberal Democrats came within ten votes of winning a seat in the ward in 2004, but Labour retained the three seats.

 
 
 
 
 
 
 
 
 
 

 * BILLD Group candidate

Cippenham Green
Cippenham Green (born 2004) is a three-member ward in the south-west of the Borough. Cippenham was a district of the old parish of Burnham. It was one of the two wards based on the old Cippenham ward, which was a Labour/Conservative marginal (six Conservative and eleven Labour wins between 1983 and 2003). This area is the western part of the previous ward, incorporates the Cippenham village area (including the Green which the ward is named after). 2003-2004: The former Cippenham ward was represented by two Labour and one Conservative Councillors. 2004: this ward elected one Conservative and two Labour Councillors.

 
 
 
 
 
 
 
 
 
 

 * BILLD Group candidate

Cippenham Meadows
Cippenham Meadows (born 2004) is a three-member ward in the south-west of the Borough. It was one of the two wards based on the old Cippenham Ward, which was a Labour/Conservative marginal (six Conservative and eleven Labour wins between 1983 and 2003). This area is the eastern part of the previous ward, incorporates the Windsor Meadows development which caused a large population growth since the 1983 redistribution of wards. Presumably these are the Meadows which the ward is named after. 2003-2004: see Cippenham Green. 2004: The new ward elected three Labour Councillors.

Colnbrook with Poyle
Colnbrook & Poyle (1995–2004), Colnbrook with Poyle (born 2004) is a (since 1997) two-member ward in the furthest east part of the Borough between to the M4 motorway and Greater London. Labour elected some Councillors here, in 1995 and 1997 (1 seat), but by 2000 the ward was safely Conservative. 2003-2004: Two Conservative Councillors. 2004: Two Conservative Councillors re-elected.

Farnham
Farnham (1930-1950 and 1983-) is a three-member ward in the west of the Borough, to the south of Britwell and west of Haymill. It was named after the old Farnham Royal parish, of which it was the southern part. This was an original Slough ward. There were Farnham North and Farnham South wards 1950–1983. A single Farnham ward was re-created in 1983. 2003-2004: Three Labour Councillors. 2004: This was a safe Labour Ward, with three Labour representatives.

 
 
 
 
 
 
 
 
 
 

 * BILLD Group candidate

Foxborough
Foxborough (born 1983) is a three-member ward in south-east Langley in the eastern part of the Borough. In the 2004 redistribution the ward lost its extension west along the southern border of Langley. It is named after a  area mentioned in connection with the inclosure of Langley Marish parish in 1809. This was the ward where the Liberal Democrats won their first election in Slough in 2000. 2003-2004: Two Labour and one Liberal Democrat Councillors. 2004: The Liberal Democrats held all three seats after the election.

 
 
 
 
 
 
 
 
 
 

 * BILLD Group candidate

Haymill
Haymill (born 1983) is a three-member ward in the west of the Borough (to the east of Farnham ward), which was left unchanged by the 2004 redistribution. It is a safe Liberal ward having last elected a non-Liberal Councillor in 1984. 2003-2004: Three Liberal Councillors. 2004: Three Liberal holds.

 
 
 
 
 
 
 
 
 
 

 * BILLD Group candidate

Kedermister
Kedermister (born 1983) is a three-member ward in south-west Langley, in the eastern part of the Borough. In 2004 it was extended south a bit. The ward was named after Sir John Kedermister (or Kidderminster), who was Warden of Langley Park and founded some almshouses in Langley in 1617. 2003-2004: three Labour Councillors. 2004: This was a safe Labour Ward, with three Labour representatives.

 
 
 
 
 
 
 
 
 
 
 
 
 

 * BILLD Group candidate

Langley St Mary's
Langley St Mary's (born 1983) is a three-member ward in north Langley, in the eastern part of the Borough. St Mary's is named after the church in Langley. This has been a Labour/Conservative marginal ward. 2003-2004: There were two Tory and one Labour Councillors. 2004: The Independent Langley Residents won two seats and tied for the third (which the Conservative candidate won on a roll of dice, so he was credited with an additional vote).

 
 
 
 
 
 
 
 
 
 
 
 

 * BILLD Group candidate

Upton
Upton (born 1930), part of the old parish of Upton-cum-Chalvey (in the south of the modern Borough), was an original ward which has existed in some form continuously since 1930. In the early nineteenth century Upton was a village about a mile and a half south-east of the hamlet of Slough. It is a three-seat ward. Upton was the most Conservative area of Slough until demographic change made Labour competitive. Labour won the ward for the first time ever in 1990. In 1997 Labour won two seats and the Conservatives one. 2003-2004: 2 Labour and 1 Conservative Councillors. 2004: The Conservatives won all three seats.

Wexham Lea
Wexham Lea (born 1983) is a three-member ward in the north of the Borough, to the north-east of Baylis & Stoke and the north of Central ward. It combines Wexham Court parish and an area known as Upton Lea. The ward was formerly safely Labour. 2003-2004: 1 Labour and 2 Independent Councillors. 2004: Securely held by Independent Councillors who won all three seats in 2004.

 
 
 
 
 
 
 
 
 
 

 * BILLD Group candidate

Members elected to Slough Borough Council 2004

Notes:
 * Member of the Britwellian, Independent, Liberal and Liberal Democrat Group (BILLD)
 (a) Simmons: Formerly served as a Councillor 1979-1994
 (b) Howard: Labour 1995-2001
 (c) Parmar: Formerly served as a Councillor 1995-2000
 (d) Stokes: Formerly served as a Labour Councillor 1983-1986
 (e) Cryer: Formerly served as a Councillor 1967-1974
 (f) Long: Formerly served as a Councillor 1983-1990
 (g) Haines: Formerly served as a Labour Councillor 1987-1991 and 1992-1998
 (h) Khan: Formerly served as a Labour Councillor 1999-2002

See also
 Slough
 Slough local elections
 Slough Borough Council
 Slough (UK Parliament constituency)

References
 The History of Slough, by Miss Maxwell Fraser (Slough Corporation 1973)
 A Short History of Slough, by Kathleen M. Jones (bound typescript volume in Slough Central Library)

External links
 The Victoria History of the County of Buckingham, Volume 3
 Slough Borough Council site
 The Boundary Committee for England page about Slough Unitary Authority, with links to pre and post 2004 ward maps

2004 English local elections
2004
2000s in Berkshire